SpongeBob SquarePants is an American animated television series created by marine biologist and animator Stephen Hillenburg that debuted on Nickelodeon in the United States on May 1, 1999. The regular voice cast consists of Tom Kenny, Bill Fagerbakke, Rodger Bumpass, Clancy Brown, Doug Lawrence, Jill Talley, Carolyn Lawrence, Mary Jo Catlett and Lori Alan. Most one-off and background characters are voiced by Dee Bradley Baker, Sirena Irwin, Bob Joles, Mark Fite, Thomas F. Wilson, Carlos Alazraqui and Jess Harnell. Throughout the show's run, it has employed numerous guest stars from many ranges of professions. Repeat guests include Ernest Borgnine, Tim Conway, Brian Doyle-Murray, Marion Ross, John O'Hurley and Michael McKean.

SpongeBob SquarePants chronicles the adventures and endeavors of the title character and his various friends in the fictional underwater city of Bikini Bottom. Many of the ideas for the show originated in an unpublished, educational comic book titled The Intertidal Zone, which Hillenburg created in the mid-1980s. He began developing SpongeBob SquarePants into a television series in 1996 upon the cancellation of Rocko's Modern Life, another Nickelodeon animated series which Hillenburg directed. While creating the show, Hillenburg, with colleague Derek Drymon, was also conducting auditions to find voices for the show's characters. He turned to Kenny, who had worked with him on Rocko's Modern Life, to voice the title character.

The cast members receive residuals every time a new episode they appeared in has aired, which Carolyn Lawrence described as "a very complicated mathematical calculation." Lawrence said in 2008 that it was a "declining scale" and the entertainment industry were "still in negotiations... both sides are still talking." She further stated that "they're still trying to work it out."

Kenny and Catlett were the first cast members to receive award nominations for their performance on SpongeBob SquarePants. They each received Annie Award nominations in 2001, but did not win. In 2010, Kenny won the Annie Award for Best Voice Acting in a Television Production, making it the first time a cast member had won this type of award. Bumpass was the first cast member to be nominated for an Emmy Award, receiving a nomination in 2012. In 2018, Kenny won both an Annie Award and an Emmy Award for his performance as SpongeBob.

Regular cast

Background

SpongeBob SquarePants has featured the voices of Tom Kenny, Bill Fagerbakke,  Rodger Bumpass,  Clancy Brown, Mr. Lawrence, Jill Talley, Carolyn Lawrence, Mary Jo Catlett and Lori Alan since it began. Stephen Hillenburg started developing the SpongeBob concept into a television series in 1996 upon the cancellation of Rocko's Modern Life, which he directed. While creating the show and writing its pilot episode in 1997, he and the show's then-creative director Derek Drymon were also conducting auditions to find voices for the show's characters.

For the voice of SpongeBob, the main character, Hillenburg approached Kenny, who previously worked with him on Rocko's Modern Life. Drymon said, "Steve [Hillenburg] wanted to find an original sounding voice [for SpongeBob]." Hillenburg utilized Kenny's and other people's personalities to help create the personality of SpongeBob. The voice of SpongeBob was originally used by Kenny for a minor character in Rocko's Modern Life. Kenny forgot the voice initially as he created it only for that single use. Hillenburg, however, remembered it when he was coming up with SpongeBob and used a video clip of the episode to remind Kenny of the voice. Kenny says that SpongeBob's high-pitched laugh was specifically created to be unique.  They wanted an annoying laugh in the tradition of Popeye and Woody Woodpecker. Fagerbakke voices SpongeBob's best friend, a starfish named Patrick Star. He auditioned for the role after Kenny had been cast as SpongeBob. Fagerbakke said, "Steve is such a lovely guy, and I had absolutely no feeling for the material whatsoever." He described his experience in the audition, saying "I was just going in for another audition, and I had no idea what was in store there in terms of the remarkable visual wit and really the kind of endearing child-like humanity in the show. I couldn't pick that up from the audition material at all. I was just kind of perfunctorially trying to give the guy what he wanted."

Rodger Bumpass provides the voice of Squidward Tentacles, and other characters. Squidward was "a very nasally, monotone kind of guy", said Bumpass. He said that the character "became a very interesting character to do" because of "his sarcasm, and then his frustration, and then his apoplexy, and so he became a wide spectrum of emotions". Voice acting veteran Clancy Brown voices Mr. Krabs, SpongeBob's boss at the Krusty Krab. For the character, Brown uses a voice that he describes as "piratey" with "a little Scottish brogue". According to Brown, his Mr. Krabs voice was improvised during his audition and it was not challenging for him to find the correct voice.

Mr. Lawrence had met Hillenburg previously on Rocko's Modern Life. When working on the pilot episode of SpongeBob, Hillenburg invited him to audition for all of the characters. Since other voices had been found for the main cast already, Lawrence started out by voicing a variety of minor characters. This included Plankton, who was initially only set to appear in one episode. Mr. Lawrence stated in an interview with Thomas F. Wilson that Nickelodeon executives told Hillenburg, "'we could stunt-cast this. You know, we could have Bruce Willis do this voice.' And Steve was just like, 'it's Doug [Lawrence], don't you hear it? This is the character! This is the guy!'" Jill Talley, Tom Kenny's wife, voices Karen Plankton. Being a Chicago native, she uses a Midwestern accent for the character. Electronic sound effects are underlaid by the series' audio engineers to create a robotic sound whenever she speaks. Talley and Lawrence often improvise their characters' dialogue. In 2009, Lawrence called improvisation his "favorite part of the voice over". He elaborated in a 2012 interview, saying, "I always enjoy the back-and-forth. [Talley and I] start to actually overlap so much talking to each other that [the voice directors] have to tell us, 'hey, stop doing that, separate what you're saying!'"

Carolyn Lawrence provides Sandy Cheeks' voice. When Lawrence was on a sidewalk in Los Feliz, Los Angeles with a friend who knew SpongeBob SquarePants casting director Donna Grillo, her friend said to the director that Lawrence had "an interesting voice". Grillo invited Lawrence to audition and she then got the role. American actress Mary Jo Catlett, who is known for her live-action roles on television programs from the 1970s such as Diff'rent Strokes and M*A*S*H, provides Mrs. Puff's voice. As of 2017, voicing Mrs. Puff has become her only regular television role; Catlett described herself as "basically retired" in 2013, since she is good friends with the other SpongeBob cast members, making the SpongeBob recording booth an easy environment that requires less preparation than in-person performances. Lori Alan voices Pearl. During her audition for the role, she was shown an early drawing of Pearl and took note of how the character was much larger than the rest of the cast. She decided to reflect the character's size in her voice by making it deep and full in tone. She aimed to make Pearl's voice invoke the sound of whales’ low vocalizations while also sounding "spoiled and lovable." In an interview with AfterBuzz TV, Alan said that she knew Pearl "had to sound somewhat like a child," but at the same time needed "an abnormally large voice."

In the Christmas special "Christmas Who?", the characters of Patchy the Pirate, the president of the fictional SpongeBob SquarePants fan club, and his pet called Potty the Parrot debuted. The former is portrayed by Kenny in live-action, while series creator Hillenburg voiced the latter. After Hillenburg's departure as the series' showrunner in 2004, staff writer Paul Tibbitt was given the role voicing Potty the Parrot. Mr. Krabs' mother, Mama Krabs, who debuted in the episode "Sailor Mouth", was voiced by Tibbitt. However, voice actress Sirena Irwin overtook Tibbitt's role as the character reappeared in the fourth season episode "Enemy In-Law" in 2005. Irwin also provides the voices of other characters in the show, including Margaret SquarePants, SpongeBob's mother.

Voice recording sessions always include a full cast of actors, which Kenny describes as "getting more unusual". Kenny said, "That's another thing that's given SpongeBob its special feel. Everybody's in the same room, doing it old radio-show style. It's how the stuff we like was recorded". It takes about four hours to record an 11-minute episode. For the first three seasons, Hillenburg and Drymon sat in on recording sessions at Nickelodeon Studios, and they directed the actors. In the fourth season, Andrea Romano took over the role as the voice director. Wednesday is recording day, the same schedule followed by the crew since 1999. Casting supervisor Jennie Monica Hammond said, "I loved Wednesdays".

Main cast

Other regular cast

Recurring guest voices

Former cast members

Awards and nominations

Notes

 A. Guest star Charles Nelson Reilly originally provided the voice of the character. Reilly died in 2007.
 B. Replaced Paul Tibbitt.
 C. Replaced John Rhys-Davies, who has voiced Man Ray in two episodes.

References

Bibliography

External links
Cast list at the Internet Movie Database

Lists of actors by comedy television series
Lists of actors by American television series
Cast members